Ekalokam Trust for Photography (EtP) is a not-for profit foundation registered in Tiruvannamalai, Tamil Nadu. The Trust's area of operation spans across modern day Tamil Nadu, Puducherry, Kerala, Karnataka, parts of Andhra Pradesh and northern Sri Lanka (the tri-Sangam period Tamilakam territory) and its connected cultures/continents. Their main projects include archiving the life and work of contemporary photographers, collective creating photographic visuals of South India and rejuvenating traditional photography. Photo Mail is an online magazine published by the Trust in English, Tamil and Malayalam.

In January 2019, The Ekalokam Trust for Photography co-hosted an exhibition called "Linking Lineages", which featured photographs shot during the 2017–2018 by contemporary photographer and photojournalist Abul Kalam Azad.

References

Photography foundations
Arts in India
Arts organisations based in India
Indian photography organisations
Organisations based in Tamil Nadu
Tiruvannamalai
Arts organizations established in 2012
2012 establishments in Tamil Nadu
Cultural organisations based in India